Teviotdale is can refer to the following:

Places
Canada
Teviotdale, Ontario, a village in Perth County, Ontario

Scotland
Teviotdale, a traditional province closely equivalent to Roxburghshire
Teviotdale, Scottish Borders - a geographical place in Roxburghshire

United States
Teviotdale (Linlithgo, New York), a historic home in the state of New York

People
David Teviotdale (1870-1958), a New Zealand farmer and museum director
Duke of Cumberland and Teviotdale, a title in the British peerage held by junior members of the British Royal Family

See also
 Archdeacon of Teviotdale
 River Teviot